Joseph John Domnanovich (March 21, 1919 – January 20, 2009) was a professional American football center in the National Football League. He played six seasons for the Boston Yanks (1946–1948) and the New York Bulldogs/Yanks (1949–1951). Prior to his professional career Domanovich played for Coach Frank Thomas at the University of Alabama from 1938–1942.  He played both linebacker and center and became All-American center at Alabama. He was voted to the All-time Alabama team for the first 50 years (1892–1942) in 1943.  Between college and his pro career he served in the 3rd Army European Theater Special Services from 1943–1946. He was inducted into the Alabama Football Hall of Fame in 1984 and the Indiana Football Hall of Fame in 1989.

He died January 20, 2009, in Birmingham, Alabama where he had resided for his adult life. His interment was located in Birmingham's Elmwood Cemetery. Domnanovich was of Croatian descent and both of his parents were born in Austria.

References

External links

1919 births
2009 deaths
American people of Croatian descent
Players of American football from South Bend, Indiana
American football centers
American football linebackers
Alabama Crimson Tide football players
All-American college football players
Boston Yanks players
New York Bulldogs players
New York Yanks players
Burials at Elmwood Cemetery (Birmingham, Alabama)